Youn Sung-Woo (born 8 November 1989) is a South Korean footballer who played as midfielder for Goyang Hi FC in K League Challenge.

Career
He was selected by FC Seoul in 2012 K-League draft. He made only an appearance in his debut season.

He moved to Goyang Hi FC on loan in 2013.

References

External links 

1989 births
Living people
Association football midfielders
South Korean footballers
FC Seoul players
Goyang Zaicro FC players
K League 1 players
K League 2 players
Sangji University alumni